Debdale Meadow, Muston is a  biological Site of Special Scientific Interest north of Muston in Leicestershire.

This traditionally managed meadow has diverse flora typical of the clay soils of the Midlands, and it has evidence of medieval ridge and furrow cultivation. Flora include cowslip, bulbous buttercup and pepper-saxifrage.

The site is private land with no public access.

References

Sites of Special Scientific Interest in Leicestershire